Odrowąż (plural: Odrowążowie or Odrowąże) was an important family of knights in the medieval Kingdom of Poland, strongly allied with the Catholic church in the 12th century.

History
Their family seats were in Upper Silesia and in Lesser Poland, and after the 13th-century invasion by the Teutonic Order, they moved to Silesia just within Lesser Poland. The progenitor of the family was Prandota Stary, who came to Poland in the 12th century from Moravia (or possibly Bohemia).

Notable members
 Iwo Odrowąż, Archbishop of Gniezno, Archbishop of Kraków
 Czesław Odrowąż vel Blessed Ceslaus
 Jacek Odrowąż vel saint Hyacinth of Poland
 Bronisława Odrowąż vel Blessed Bronisława
 Jan Prandota, Archbishop of Kraków
 Jan Odrowąż, Archbishop of Lwów
 Jan II Odrowąż of Sprowa, Archbishop of Gniezno
 Andrzej Odrowąż, Voivode of Podole, founder of the Bernardine Church in Lwów.
 Jan Odrowąż of Sprowa, starost of Lwów, Voivode of Ruthenia and Voivode of Podole
 Jan of Szczekociny, castellan of Lublin
 Piotr Odrowąż of Sprowa, starost of Lwów, Voivode of Ruthenia and Podole
 Zofia Odrowąż, married Hetman Jan Krzysztof Tarnowski h. Leliwa
 Stanisław Odrowąż, Voivode of Ruthenia and Podole, married to Anna of Masovia
 Jakub Dembiński, Great Chancellor of the Crown
 Strasz of Białaczów, knight, starost of Łęczyca

Branches of the family 
 Bębnowscy
 Białaczowscy
 Chlewiccy
 Dembińscy
 Kamieńscy
 Koneccy (vel  Konieccy)
 Maliccy (from Malice Kcyńskie)
 Modliszewscy
 Sprowscy
 Sypniewski
 Szydłowiecki
 Wądołowscy

Coat of arms
The family used the Odrowąż coat of arms.

Palaces

Related Houses
 clan Gryf
 Piast dynasty
 clan Łabędź
 Kołda of clan Oksza
 House of Spyra of clan Pernus

See also
 Odrowąż, Świętokrzyskie Voivodeship

References